Queen Wonseong of the Ansan Gim clan (d. 15 August 1028) or formally called as Grand Queen Mother Wonseong was a Korean queen consort as the 3rd wife of King Hyeonjong of Goryeo who became the mother of his successors, Deokjong and Jeongjong.

She was born into the Ansan Gim clan as the eldest daughter of Gim Eun-bu (김은부) and Lady Yi, daughter of Yi Heo-gyeom (이허겸) from the Incheon Yi clan. Gim Eun-bu was an influential royal court favorite and official. In 1010, King Hyeonjong who had fled to Naju, Jeolla-do due to the Khitan's invasion, stayed overnight in Gongju, Chungcheongnam-do at Gim Eun-bu's house and Gim welcomed him with made his eldest daughter serve Hyeonjong comfortably. It was said too that Lady Gim made and dedicated clothes to Hyeonjong own. After this, Eun-bu's two other daughters also married to Hyeonjong.

According to Goryeosa, she firstly entered the palace in 1011 and honoured as Primary Lady Yeongyeong (연경원주, 延慶院主) not long after bore her eldest son, Wang Heum in 1016. Then, she was given the "Yeongyeong Palace" (연경궁, 延慶宮) and became Princess Yeongyeong (연경궁주, 延慶宮主) after bore her second son, Wang Hyeong in 1018. Beside Heum and Hyeong, she also bore Hyeonjong 2 other daughters. In 1022, she formally became a Queen consort and stayed in "Janggyeong Palace" (장경궁, 長慶宮) five years later in 1027. However, she eventually died a year later and was buried in Myeongneung tomb (명릉, 明陵) alongside enshrined in her husband's shrine later.

Family
Father: Gim Eun-bu (김은부, 金殷傅; d. 11 June 1017)
Grandfather: Gim Geung-pil (김긍필, 金兢弼)
1st Older brother: Gim Chung-chan (김충찬, 金忠贊; d. July 1036)
2nd Older brother: Gim Nan-won (김난원, 金爛圓; 1055–1101)
1st Younger sister: Queen Wonhye (원혜왕후; d. 1022)
2nd Younger sister: Queen Wonpyeong (원평왕후; d. 1028)
Mother: Grand Lady of Ansan County of the Incheon Yi clan (안산군대부인 인천 이씨); formally called as "Grand Lady of the Anhyo State" (안효국대부인, 安孝國大夫人)
Grandfather: Yi Heo-gyeom (이허겸, 李許謙) – the founder of the Incheon Yi clan.
Grandmother: Grand Lady of Ansan County of the Gyeongju Gim clan (안산군대부인 경주 김씨)
Uncle: Yi Han (이한, 李翰)
Cousin: Yi Ja-yeon (이자연, 李子淵; 1003–1061) – father of Queen Inye, Consort Ingyeong, and Consort Ingjeol.
Cousin: Yi Ja-sang (이자상, 李子祥) – grandfather of Consort Jeongsin.
Uncle: Yi Nul (이눌, 李訥)
Uncle: Yi Jin (이진, 李玲)
Husband: King Hyeonjong of Goryeo (고려 현종; 992–1031)
1st son: King Deokjong of Goryeo (고려 덕종; 1016–1034)
2nd son: King Jeongjong of Goryeo (고려 정종; 1018–1046)
1st daughter: Queen Inpyeong (인평왕후)
2nd daughter: Princess Gyeongsuk (경숙공주)

Posthumous name
After King Deokjong's ascension to the throne in 1031, he honoured his late mother as Grand Queen Mother (왕태후, 王太后) and gave her a Posthumous name as Yong-ui (용의, 容懿) and Gong-hye (공혜, 恭惠).
In October 1056 (10th year reign of King Munjong), name Yeong-mok (영목, 英穆); Yang-deok (양덕, 良德); Sin-jeol (신절, 信節); and Sun-seong (순성, 順聖) was added.
In April 1140 (18th year reign of King Injong), name Ja-seong (자성, 慈聖) was added.
In October 1253 (40th year reign of King Gojong), name Gwang-seon (광선, 廣宣) was added to her Posthumous name too.

In popular culture
Portrayed by Jung Han-bi in the 2009 KBS2 TV series Empress Cheonchu.

References

External links
Queen Wonseong on Encykorea .
Queen Wonseong on Digital Ansan Cultural Exhibition .
원성태후 on Doosan Encyclopedia .
Eckert, Lee, Lew, Robinson and Wagner, Korea Old and New: A History, Harvard University Press, 1990. 

10th-century births
Year of birth unknown
1028 deaths
Consorts of Hyeonjong of Goryeo
Korean queens consort
11th-century Korean women